Maria Epifania Garcia Boyle, better known by her stage name Marissa Delgado, is a Filipino actress of American descent. She has appeared in nearly 90 films from 1965 up to present. She is the mother of former character actor Kevin Delgado and commercial model Avon Garcia.

Career
Delgado won two awards in Philippine films - Best Supporting Actress for Lumuha Pati Mga Anghel in 1971, and  Till Death Do Us Part in 1972. She was nominated for Gawad Urian Award in 1977 for Ligaw Na Bulaklak and FAMAS Award, Best Supporting Actress for Sa Akin Pa Rin ang Bukas in 1988.

Delgado started in showbiz as an extra via Dance-O-Rama starred Susan Roces and Jose Mari as the lead actors. After 2 years, she came back as made her a leading lady of two of the great comedians  in the Philippines which is Dolphy and Chiquito from the film Dalawang Kumander sa WAC.

Because of her sharp looks, she was often cast as a "kontrabida" (villain) with penchant for big earrings, curly hair, mini-skirts and heavy make-up. A favorite of National Artist for Film, Lino Brocka, Delgado was seen in films - Tubog sa Ginto (1970); Stardoom (1971); Bona (1979), Ang Tatay Kong Nanay (1976), Mananayaw (1978) as a feisty type of a woman. She would also be seen in Chaning Carlos films like Bato-bato sa Langit (1976); Divino (1976); Darna, Kuno? (1979). Other film assignments include Lipad, Darna, Lipad! (1973); Wonder Vi (1974); Tao Ako Di Hayop (1976); Ligaw Na Bulaklak (1976); Buhay Mo, Buhay Ko (1976); Darna at Ding (1980); Diborsyda (1980); Bomba Star (1979); I Can't Stop Loving You (1985); Pahiram ng Ligaya (1985); Rosa Mistica (1988); Sa Akin Pa Rin ang Bukas (1988); Umiyak Pati Langit (1991); Espadang Patpat (1991); Kabit ni Mrs. Montero (1991); Bitoy ang Itawag Mo sa Akin (1997); Pagdating ng Panahon (2001).

She became a household name when she portrayed the comic character Manay Sharon in Duplex over RPN-9 every Saturday. She is the funny and yet loving wife of Daddy Groovy as played by director Ading Fernando and the mistress of the dim-witted Liweng as ably portrayed by Janice Jurado and the friend of Neneng as essayed by Soxy Topacio. The sitcom started in 1980 until 1984.

She is the mother of Avon Garcia, Binibining Pilipinas 1987 finalist and Siegfried Garcia, child actor in Kaluskos Musmos (1979–81)

In 1985, she opened a recruitment and talent agency, wherein she develops and sends Filipino entertainers in jobs abroad. She took a respite in showbiz but occasionally would be seen in teleseryes. In 2016, she graduated from the University of the Visayas in Cebu City with a BSBA major in HRM.

Filmography

Film

Television

References

External links

Filipino people of American descent
Living people
Filipino film actresses
Filipino television personalities
Filipino women comedians
Year of birth missing (living people)

GMA Network personalities
ABS-CBN personalities
TV5 (Philippine TV network) personalities